Samir Lemoudaâ, last name also spelt sometimes Lemouadaâ, (born 20 July 1981) is an Algerian professional footballer who plays as a midfielder for Algerian Ligue Professionnelle 2 club CA Bordj Bou Arreridj.

Lemoudaâ was a member of the ES Sétif team that won the 2006-07 Algerian Championnat National and the 2006–07 Arab Champions League.

Honours

Club
 ES Sétif
Algerian Championnat National: 2006-07
Arab Champions League: 2006–07

References

External links
Details at LNF.dz

1981 births
Living people
Algerian footballers
Algerian Ligue Professionnelle 1 players
Algerian Ligue 2 players
CA Bordj Bou Arréridj players
MO Béjaïa players
ES Sétif players
CA Batna players
MSP Batna players
People from Mila Province
USM Sétif players
Association football midfielders
21st-century Algerian people